Tagi may refer to:
Tagi, a tribe in  Survivor: Borneo
Tagi, local Samoan name for Gymnosarda unicolor, a species of fish
Tagi, the Fijian word meaning "To cry" (see Wiktionary entry)
Tagi in Taukei, Fijian phrase meaning the voice of the Fijian people
Tagi, abbreviation for the name of the newspaper Tages Anzeiger in Zurich, Switzerland

People:
Pita Tagi Cakiverata, Fijian politician.
Tagi (Ginti mayor), mayor/ruler of 1350 BC Amarna letters city Gintikirmil in Canaan

Places:
Nakhl Taqi - also known as Tagi, a city in Iran
Taji - also known as Tagi, Iraq
Tagi Station, a railway station in Japan

In fiction:
Tagi, a character from the online video series Pure Pwnage